Pimelea ferruginea, commonly known as pink rice flower or coastal banjine, is a species of flowering plant in the family Thymelaeaceae and is endemic to near-coastal areas of south-western Western Australia. It is a dense, erect shrub with elliptic to narrowly elliptic leaves and head-like clusters of pale to deep pink, tube-shaped flowers.

Description
Flowering mainly occurs from August to February.

Taxonomy
Pimelea ferruginea was first formally described in 1805 by Jacques Labillardière in his Novae Hollandiae Plantarum Specimen. The specific epithet (ferruginea) means "rust-coloured".

Distribution and habitat
Pink rice flower grows on coastal sand dunes and rocky headlands in near-coastal areas between Cliff Head near Arrowsmith, and Point Culver, in the Esperance Plains, Geraldton Sandplains, Jarrah Forest, Mallee, Swan Coastal Plain and Warren bioregions of south-western Western Australia.

Conservation status
Pimelea ferruginea is listed as "not threatened" by the Government of Western Australia Department of Biodiversity, Conservation and Attractions.

References

Malvales of Australia
ferruginea
Flora of Western Australia
Taxa named by Jacques Labillardière
Plants described in 1805